House of Assembly elections were held in Tobago on 7 December 1992 to elect the twelve members of the Tobago House of Assembly. The governing National Alliance for Reconstruction won eleven seats with 58.7% of the vote, while the People's National Movement won one seat with 37.03% of the vote.

Results

Notes

References

Tobago
Local elections in Trinidad and Tobago
1992 in Trinidad and Tobago